Iron Belt is an unincorporated census-designated place located in Iron County, Wisconsin, United States. Iron Belt is located on Wisconsin Highway 77 southwest of Montreal, in the town of Knight. Iron Belt has a post office with ZIP code 54536. As of the 2010 census, its population was 173.

References

Census-designated places in Iron County, Wisconsin
Census-designated places in Wisconsin